Bogyoke Aung San Road (formerly Montgomery Road) is a major road of southern Yangon, Burma. It crosses the city in a west–east direction, running parallel with Maha Bandula Road. The road contains several hospitals, BEHS 1 Latha (Central High School), BEHS 2 Latha (St. John's Convent School) and  Yangon General Hospital is just off the road.

Streets in Yangon